Nusaybin District is a district of the Mardin Province of Turkey. The seat of the district is the town of Nusaybin and the population was 113,728 in 2021.

Status 
With the administrative reform in 2012, Nusaybin District contains eighty-four neighborhoods of which fifteen form the town of Nusaybin.

Settlements

Center neighborhoods 

 8. Mart
 Abdulkadirpaşa
 Barış
 Devrim
 Dicle
 Fırat
 Gırnavas
 İpekyolu
 Kışla
 Mor-Yakup
 Selahattin Eyyübi
 Yenişehir
 Yenituran
 Yeşilkent
 Zeynelabidin

Rural neighborhoods 

 Acıkköy
 Açıkyol
 Akağıl
 Akarsu
 Akçatarla
 Bahçebaşı
 Bakacık
 Balaban
 Beylik
 Büyükkardeş
 Çağlar
 Çalıköy
 Çatalözü
 Çiğdem
 Çilesiz
 Çölova
 Dağiçi
 Dallıağaç
 Değirmencik
 Demirtepe
 Dibek
 Dirim
 Doğanlı
 Doğuş
 Durakbaşı
 Duruca
 Düzce
 Eskihisar
 Eskimağara
 Eskiyol
 Girmeli
 Görentepe
 Günebakan
 Güneli
 Günyurdu,
 Gürün
 Güvenli
 Hasantepe
 Heybeyi
 İkiztepe
 Ilkadım
 Kalecik
 Kaleli
 Kantar
 Karacaköy
 Kayadibi
 Kocadağ
 Kuruköy
 Kuyulu
 Küçükkardeş
 Nergizli
 Odabaşı)
 Pazarköy
 Sınırtepe
 Söğütlü
 Taşköy 
 Tekağaç
 Tepealtı
 Tepeören
 Tepeüstü
 Turgutköy
 Üçköy 
 Üçyol 
 Yandere
 Yavruköy
 Yazyurdu
 Yerköy
 Yolbilen
 Yolindi

References 

Districts of Mardin Province